Cary  may refer to:

Places 
United States
 Cary, Illinois, part of the Chicago metropolitan area
 Cary, Indiana, part of the Indianapolis metropolitan area
 Cary, Miami County, Indiana
 Cary, Maine
 Cary, Mississippi
 Cary, North Carolina, part of the Research Triangle
 Cary, Wisconsin

United Kingdom
 Cary (barony), County Antrim, Northern Ireland
 Castle Cary, Somerset, England

Other uses 
 Cary (given name)
 Cary (surname)
 Cary Academy
 Cary Audio Design, manufacturer of vacuum tube and solid state audio components
 Cary Instruments, the optical instrumentation division of Varian Instruments
 River Cary
 Typhoon Cary, the name of three tropical cyclones in the western north Pacific Ocean

See also 
 Carey (disambiguation)
 Caries, a progressive destruction of any kind of bone structure
 Carrie (disambiguation)
 Carry (disambiguation)
 Kary (disambiguation)

ru:Кэри